Liknades is a village located in the Tsotyli municipality, situated in western Kozani regional unit, in the Greek region of Macedonia. The village is 75 kilometers east of the town of Kozani.

Liknades's elevation is 741 meters above sea level. The postal code is 50002, while the telephone code is +30 24680. At the 2011 census the population was 27.

On a hilltop located in the side of the village were discovered the remains of an important ancient settlement of Elimiotis.

References

Populated places in Kozani (regional unit)